Jerome Alexandre Alain Laxale (born 20 November 1983) is an Australian politician as a member for the Australian Labor Party (ALP), representing as the Member of Parliament for Bennelong after being elected at the 2022 federal election.

Laxale was formerly Councillor of the City of Ryde from 2012 to July 2022 and was the City's Mayor, serving two terms in 2015 to 2016 and from 2017 to 2022.

Early life and career
Laxale was born on 20 November 1983 in the Sydney suburb of Westmead to a father from Mauritius and a mother from Réunion, a French overseas department. His father was a member of the Mauritian Militant Movement (MMM). Laxale was educated at The King's School. He then attended University of New South Wales and majored in Politics and International Relations and the French language. After finishing university, he joined the family business supplying hair and beauty products as a small business director.

Political career
Laxale joined the Labor Party in 2004 and was the Eastwood Labor branch president since 2008. He is a member of the Labor Left faction.

City of Ryde
Laxale was first elected to the City of Ryde for the West Ward in the 2012 local government elections.

Laxale became Mayor of the Council on 8 September 2015 and was at the time the youngest ever in this role at the age of 31. At the end of the one-year term on 16 September 2016, Laxale was replaced as Mayor by Liberal Councillor Bill Pickering by a 7–5 vote of the Council.

After the local government elections in September 2017, on 26 September 2017, the newly-elected Council elected Laxale to be the Mayor again for a two-year term. He was re-elected in September 2019 and in September 2021, serving as mayor until January 2022.

In addition to his duties as a Councillor in the City of Ryde, Laxale is also the Treasurer in the Local Government NSW (LGNSW) Board, a position he was elected to in October 2019.

Laxale resigned as Councillor on 22 July 2022 after he was elected to federal parliament.

Attempts to enter state politics
Laxale contested the state seat of Ryde as the Labor candidate in the 2011, 2015 and 2019 state elections but lost to incumbent Liberal Party member Victor Dominello in all three occasions. However, his primary vote and two-party-preferred vote (TPP) had increased in each election, starting with 17.0% primary vote and 24.3% TPP in 2011, increasing to 30.4% primary vote and 41% of the TPP in 2019.

Federal politics
Laxale was the Labor Party candidate for the Division of Bennelong in the 2022 federal election. In order to stand for election, he renounced his French and Mauritian citizenships, which he inherited from his mother and father respectively. He was successful in his election and won the seat from the Liberal Party, becoming just the second Labor Member for the former Liberal Party stronghold seat in more than 70 years.

Personal life
Laxale has a son and twin daughters from a previous marriage. Laxale's current partner is Jo Taranto.

Laxale has lived in the City of Ryde and the electorate of Bennelong since 2006. He lives in North Ryde.

Laxale is highly proficient in the French, German and French-based Creoles and Pidgin languages.

References

External links 
 

Australian Labor Party mayors
Mayors of Ryde
Living people
1983 births
21st-century Australian politicians
University of New South Wales alumni
Australian Labor Party members of the Parliament of Australia
Labor Left politicians
Members of the Australian House of Representatives for Bennelong
Australian people of French descent
Australian people of Mauritian descent
People of Réunionnais descent
People educated at The King's School, Parramatta